Taiúva is a municipality in the state of São Paulo in Brazil. The population is 5,564 (2020 est.) in an area of 132 km². The elevation is 630 m.

References

Municipalities in São Paulo (state)